
The following lists events that happened during 1850 in South Africa.

Events

 Wesleyan settlers arrive in Natal
 The "Childe Herold", a British ship en route from Bombay to London is wrecked off Dassen Island, Cape Colony
 23 April — A mass meeting is held in Cape Town to petition Queen Victoria to grant the Cape Colony a government

Births
 9 April — Julius Charles Wernher, financier and mine magnate
 23 April — Andries Jacobus Bester, the Boer commandant of the Bethlehem commando, is born in Bloemfontein
 4 September 1850 - Abraham Fischer, Prime Minister of the Orange River Colony. (d. 1913)

References
See Years in South Africa for list of References

 
South Africa
Years in South Africa